Chale Green is a hamlet on the B3399 road about a mile inland from the village of Chale on the Isle of Wight. Administratively it is part of Chale.

History
Originally Chale Green was known as Stroudgreen. There is a Stroud Green Farm north of Chale Green. By 1870, around Chale Green was a wheelwright, carpenter, chimney sweep business, The New Inn tavern, a blacksmith, a grocer and a shoemaker. Sprake's Brewery was founded in Chale Green in 1833. A sawpit existed in the early 20th century in Chale Green. The Star Pub in Chale Green recently closed.

Chale Green was part of Charles Seely's property in the 19th century. Charles Seely built the local Military Road in the 1860s to bolster the defence of the coastal region. This was meant to allow the deployment of troops along the clifftops in case of an invasion. Before this the villages in the Back of the Wight were connected only by small roads reaching over the downs and through small gaps like Shorwell Shute.

Spanners Close, the largest residential development in the Chale area was built to the west of Chale Green in the late 1970s. It consists of 70 housing units.

Today
Public transport is provided by Southern Vectis buses operating on route 6 between Ventnor and Newport bus station.

Chale Green is home to the Chale Kite Flyers, an informal group of kite flyers.

References

External links

History of Chale website
official Chale Kite flyers website

Villages on the Isle of Wight